Ball Park Music is the eponymous sixth studio album by Australian indie rock band Ball Park Music. It was written and recorded in Brisbane throughout the 2019–20 Australian bushfire season, and released on 23 October 2020. The album was preceded by three singles – "Spark Up!", "Day & Age" and notably "Cherub", which polled at number four in the Triple J Hottest 100 of 2020.

The record achieved commercial success, debuting at number 2 on the ARIA Albums Chart. It was nominated for Australian Album of the Year at the 2020 J Awards and Album of the Year at the 2021 Queensland Music Awards, winning the latter. It was further nominated for Best Independent Release and Best Rock Album at the 2021 ARIA Awards.

Background
A week prior to the announcement of the album, the band's 2011 single "It's Nice to Be Alive" placed at number 17 in Triple J's Hottest 100 of the 2010s. The band's guitarist Dean Hanson discussed the result whilst premiering lead single "Spark Up!" on the station's breakfast program, Breakfast with Sally and Erica, stating: "[It's] so good. We could not be happier to see the company that our little song is in, with some big hitters of the decade. I think we all know we're in a simulation at the moment but that solidifies it for us."

Recording
The band began recording the album in October 2019 at the beginning of the 2019–20 Australian bushfire season. The album was primarily recorded in Stafford, Brisbane.

Recording locations
Main recording locations
 Prawn HQ (Ball Park Music's home studio), Brisbane, Queensland – vocals, mixing
 Free Energy Device, Sydney, New South Wales – mixing
 King Willy Sound, Launceston, Tasmania – mastering

Additional recording locations
 Jennifer Boyce's bedroom, Sydney, New South Wales – additional vocals

Release
Lead single "Spark Up!" was released on 19 March 2020, alongside the announcement their forthcoming record would be titled Mostly Sunny. This name would later be changed eponymously on 23 April, after the band decided the initial title did not match the overall theme of the album. The album artwork designed by Polly Bass Boost and band member Dean Hanson was issued alongside the announcement. In an interview with Triple J, keyboardist Paul Furness elaborated on the decision to change the title:Mostly Sunny didn't feel right for a number of reasons. We always did like the title – it had a similar rhythm to it as Good Mood and felt like a continuation. As we've finished this album we've realised, it's really not a continuation of Good Mood. It is its own thing with a different emotional palette.On 5 June 2020, second single "Day & Age" was released. On 16 August, the band performed "Day & Age" live from the Black Bear Lodge bar in Brisbane for Australian live music program The Sound. On 3 August, the band began selling face masks branded with the album's cover artwork following a Tweet parodying the chorus of "Spark Up!", with the lyrics "Life is short / The doors are shut / I say we mask up".

The record's final single "Cherub" was issued on 28 August. The band performed the track live from Prawn Records HQ on 11 September for NME Australia. All three singles had been premiered by Triple J prior to their digital releases.

Ball Park Music was released on 23 October 2020 through Prawn Records and Inertia Music in digital and physical formats. The same day, the band performed live on Triple J's Like a Version segment, performing a cover of Radiohead's "Paranoid Android" alongside their original track "Cherub".

Commercial performance
On 28 October 2020, Australian Recording Industry Association (ARIA) announced in their mid-week report that the album was in contention to debut within the top 10 on the ARIA Albums Chart. On 31 October 2020, Ball Park Music debuted and peaked at number 2 on the ARIA Albums Chart for the chart dated 2 November 2020, tying with Puddinghead (2014) as their highest peak in the region.

Awards and nominations

AIR Awards

! 
|-
! scope="row"| 2021
| Ball Park Music
| Independent Album of the Year
| 
| 
|}

J Awards

! 
|-
! scope="row"| 2020
| Ball Park Music
| Australian Album of the Year
| 
| 
|}

Queensland Music Awards

! 
|-
! scope="row"| 2021
| Ball Park Music
| Album of the Year
| 
| 
|}

Track listing

Personnel
Adapted from the album's liner notes.

Musicians
Ball Park Music
 Sam Cromack – writing, vocals, guitar, synthesiser, shaker 
 Jennifer Boyce – vocals, bass guitar, kazoo 
 Daniel Hanson – writing , drums, tambourine, wheelbarrow, bongos, vocals 
 Dean Hanson – writing , guitar, vocals, bass guitar 
 Paul Furness – writing , piano, rhodes, trombone, synthesiser, mellotron, tambourine, vocals 
Other musicians
 Tom Myers – additional vocals 
 Florence the Dog – "panting"

Technical
 Paul McKercher – mixing 
 Sam Cromack – mixing 
 William Bowden – mastering

Artwork
 Polly Bass Boost – artwork, design
 Dean Hanson – artwork, design, photography

Charts

Notes

References

2020 albums
Ball Park Music albums
Albums produced by Sam Cromack
Prawn Records albums